BMTC may refer to:

Bangalore Metropolitan Transport Corporation in Bangalore, India
Basic Military Training Centre in Singapore